William Alfred Fitzherbert (1842 – 2 February 1906) was the first Mayor of Lower Hutt, New Zealand, from when Lower Hutt became a borough in 1891 to 1898. He was an engineer and farmer in New Zealand.

William Fitzherbert was born in London in 1842, a son of William Fitzherbert. The family followed his father to Wellington about 1846. Fitzherbert was educated in Wellington, at Sydney Grammar School, and at Canterbury University College. He was an engineer with the Wellington Provincial Council and with the Hutt County Council. He farmed in the Wanganui district, and then in the Hutt Valley and in Hawke's Bay.

On 17 November 1875, he married Fanny, the adopted daughter of George Waterhouse. They had five daughters and four sons.

In 1904 he built Norbury, now Minoh Friendship House, to house his daughter Alice and her husband George William von Zedlitz, Victoria University's first professor of modern languages. Alice married Professor von Zedlitz in 1905, and Alicetown in Lower Hutt was named after her.

Fitzherbert died suddenly in Lower Hutt on 2 February 1906 of heart failure.

In 2011, plaques were installed on 13 boulders at the Hutt Recreation Ground commemorating the first 13 mayors.

References

1842 births
1906 deaths
Mayors of Lower Hutt
New Zealand farmers
English emigrants to New Zealand
19th-century New Zealand politicians
19th-century New Zealand engineers